KVOZ, branded as "Radio Cristiana", is a Spanish-language Christian talk format AM radio station that serves the Laredo, Texas, United States and Nuevo Laredo, Tamaulipas, Mexico border area. Its transmitter is located in Del Mar Hills, Texas.

External links

VOZ
Talk radio stations in the United States
VOZ
VOZ
Radio stations established in 1983